The Copa Rio was founded in 1991 by the Rio de Janeiro State Football Federation to decide one of the Rio de Janeiro's Copa do Brasil representatives of the following year (the other being the Campeonato Carioca champion). If the state champion had also won Copa Rio, the representative would have been the tournament runner-up.

However, in 1995 the Brazilian Football Confederation established the possibility of a club being invited to dispute Copa do Brasil, and, as a consequence of this, Copa Rio ended up not being interesting for the big teams, so it was discontinued.

In 1996 and 1997, the competition was replaced by a similar competition disputed only by Rio de Janeiro state countryside clubs, commonly known as Copa do Interior (Portuguese for Countryside Cup).

In 1998, there was an attempt to recreate Copa Rio, but without the qualification to Copa do Brasil. This attempt was a failure, and after three years, the competition was discontinued again.

In 2005 and in 2007, the competition was held again, but without the participation of the big clubs of the state, and again without qualification to Copa do Brasil.

In 2008, the third-placed team (Madureira) was eligible to play in Copa Rio-Espírito Santo.

Champions

Titles by team

Copa do Interior

List of champions

Titles by team

See also
Campeonato Carioca

References

External links
Champions at RSSSF
2005 Copa Rio at RSSSF

  
Football cup competitions in Rio de Janeiro (state)